Two ships of the Royal Navy have borne the name HMS Canso, after the town of Canso in Nova Scotia:

 , a schooner captured in 1813 during the War of 1812 and sold in 1816

Royal Navy ship names